Interstate 264 (I-264) is a partial loop around the city of Louisville, Kentucky, south of the Ohio River. An auxiliary route of I-64, it is signed as the Shawnee Expressway for its first  from its western terminus at I-64/U.S. Route 150 (US 150) to US 31W/US 60 and as the Watterson Expressway for the remainder of its length from US 31W/US 60 to its northeastern terminus at I-71.

I-264 is Louisville's inner beltway (in conjunction with I-64 and I-71), and the later constructed I-265, the Gene Snyder Freeway, is Louisville's outer beltway. I-264 is currently used as the primary detour route when I-64 is closed through Downtown Louisville. However, in late 2016 with the completion of the Lewis and Clark Bridge, the formerly separate segments of I-265 in Kentucky and Indiana have been connected to provide another detour route.

In discussions about the city, I-264 is often used as a rough line dividing the older areas of Louisville from its suburbs.

Route description

History

In 1948, a two-lane bypass was built between Shelbyville Road and US 31W (Dixie Highway) in Louisville as a relocation of US 60. It was named the "Watterson Expressway" after local journalist and editor Henry Watterson. In the late 1950s, work began to update the original two-lane road that was upgraded to a four-lane controlled-access highway while simultaneously extended to US 42 which would be finished by 1965. In the late 1960s, it would be extended further to its eastern terminus at I-71 as it was being built around the same time. Between 1970 and 1974, the western segment from Dixie Highway to I-64 northwest of Downtown Louisville was opened in segments when the entire expressway became part of the Interstate Highway System and designated as I-264. The original section from Dixie Highway to I-71 still retained the "Watterson Expressway" moniker and was cosigned, along with the original US 60 designation, as I-264, while the western segment was originally named the "Shawnee Expressway", even though signage referred to it simply as "I-264", with no mention of the "Shawnee Expressway" name. The Interstate was completed in 1974. The designation US 60 was dropped in 1984 when the original surface roads through Louisville were restored to their original US 60 designations. On April 1, 2010, the Kentucky General Assembly designated the western portion to be renamed as the Georgia Davis Powers Expressway. The original Dixie Highway to I-71 segment signage reads as "I-264 Watterson Expressway", while the western segment signage still only reads as "I-264", with a small sign at both the western I-64 terminus and the Dixie interchange reading "Georgia Davis Powers Expressway".

Watterson Expressway reconstruction (1985–1995)

The Watterson Expressway underwent a major reconstruction effort that began in 1985. The vintage freeway had outlived its useful purpose and had numerous characteristics that defined it as a blight on Louisville: deteriorating overpasses, buckling pavement, deficient and too closely spaced interchanges, and rampant congestion. Dozens of bridges were reconstructed and widened, and the majority of the interchanges were redesigned and rebuilt from the ground up from US 31W east to Shelbyville Road. The entire highway reconstruction project was completed in 1995.

A typical deficient interchange along I-264 was the I-65, Kentucky Exposition Center, and Louisville International Airport exit. Before the reconstruction, two cloverleafs with no collector–distributor lanes existed and posed serious weaving issues. The interchange today has been rebuilt and features numerous flyovers and collector–distributor lanes, making it safer though not necessarily easier to navigate.

Shawnee Expressway reconstruction (2003–2004)
The segment of I-264 from US 31W to the northwest I-64 interchange opened in segments from 1970 to August 1974 and received no more than emergency or spot patching. After several years of planning, in early 2003, the Kentucky Transportation Cabinet (KYTC) began a rehabilitation project on this segment of Interstate Highway stretching from the US 31W interchange northwest to just east of Bank Street.

A concrete surface several inches thick was constructed on the mainline and access ramps, a new median barrier was formed, new lighting fixtures were installed, 37 bridges were rehabilitated, 380 new roadway signage was posted, and all guardrails were replaced as part of the  project. In addition, the segment from River Park Drive to I-64, which was only two lanes, was widened to three lanes. No major ramp or interchange modifications were needed. The highway reconstruction project costed approximately $66 million (equivalent to $ in ) and required 18 months of labor.

About 70,000 vehicles a day use the portion of I-264 near US 31W and about 40,000 daily use the segment near its western terminus with I-64.

KY 1447 interchange (2008–2010)
Although the Kentucky General Assembly considered plans for an interchange with Kentucky Route 1447 (KY 1447, Westport Road) as early as 1992, work did not begin until October 2008 and was completed in May 2010.

Exit list

See also
Roads in Louisville, Kentucky

References

Further reading

External links

Interstate-Guide.com - Interstate 264 (KY) page

64-2
64-2 Kentucky
0264
264
2 (Kentucky)
U.S. Route 60
Transportation in Jefferson County, Kentucky